Letter or ANSI Letter is a paper size standard defined by the American National Standards Institute, commonly used as home or office stationery in the United States, Canada, Chile, Colombia, Costa Rica, Mexico, Panama, Guatemala, the Dominican Republic and the Philippines.  It measures  and is similar in use to the A4 paper standard used by most other countries, defined in ISO 216 by the International Organization for Standardization.

Details
The Reagan administration made Letter-size paper the norm for US federal forms in the early 1980s; previously, the smaller "official" Government Letter size,  (aspect ratio: 1.3125), was used in government, while  paper was standard in most other offices.

In the US, paper density is usually measured in "pound per reams" (of 500 sheets). One ream of 20-pound Letter-sized paper weighs , and a single Letter-sized sheet of 20-pound paper weighs , which is equivalent to 75.19 g/m2. Some metric information is typically included on American ream packaging. For example, 20-pound paper is also labeled as 75 g/m2. The most common density of A4 paper is 80 g/m2.

The related paper size known as half letter, statement, or organizer L is exactly one half of the US Letter size:  (8.5 × 5.5 in).

History 
The precise origins of the dimensions of US letter-size paper (8.5 × 11 in) are not known. The American Forest & Paper Association says that the standard US dimensions have their origin in the days of manual papermaking, the 11-inch length of the standard paper being about a quarter of "the average maximum stretch of an experienced vatman's arms".

See also
 ANSI/ASME Y14.1
 ISO 216 (definition of metric paper sizes, e.g., A4)
 Paper size: loose sizes

References

Mechanical standards
Stationery